Telangana Joint Action Committee (TJAC) is a Telangana activist group. It is an organisation which is fighting for the realisation of statehood for Telangana region. It was formed on 24 December. It is an umbrella organisation comprising various wings such as students, employees etc. The Chairman of TJAC is M. Kodandaram. It organisation protests like the Sakkala Janula Samme, Million March, Telangana March etc.

History
TJAC was formed in 2009 to bring all the organisations and political parties under one roof. The Congress party and TDP were its members initially but withdrew later.

Activities
TJAC has taken up various forms of protests like hunger strikes, road blocks, etc., for the formation of Telangana state. They celebrate carving out of Telangana State out of the state of United Andhra Pradesh

References

Nationalist movements in Asia
Organisations based in Telangana
Telangana movement
2009 establishments in Andhra Pradesh
Organizations established in 2009